Lock is a surname, and may refer to:

 Bob Lock (born 1949), Welsh science fiction and fantasy writer
 Charles Lock (1770–1804), British consul-general in Naples who quarrelled with Admiral Horatio Nelson regarding the latter's military actions
 Charlie Lock (born 1962), Zimbabwean cricketer
 C. N. H. Lock (1894–1949), English aerodynamicist
 David Lock (born 1960), barrister and Labour Party politician in the United Kingdom
 Don Lock (born 1936), former Major League Baseball outfielder
 Drew Lock (born 1996), American football quarterback
 Édouard Lock (born 1954), Canadian dance choreographer
 Eric Lock (1919–1941), British Royal Air Force fighter ace of the Second World War
 Herbert Lock (1887–1957), English goalkeeper who played for Southampton and Rangers
 James Lock (sound engineer) (1939–2009), two-time Grammy Award winner in the area of classical music
 James Lock, an early owner (from 1759) and head of James Lock & Co., hatters in London
 John Bascombe Lock (1849–1921), bursar of Gonville and Caius College, Cambridge
 Matthias Lock, English 18th-century furniture designer and cabinet-maker
 Mi Kwan Lock, French actress
 Patti Frazer Lock (born 1953), American mathematician and statistician
 Ray Lock, a Royal Air Force air vice-marshal
 Robert Heath Lock (1879–1915), English geneticist
 Sean Lock (1963–2021), English comedy writer, comedian and actor
 Tony Lock (1929–1995), English Test cricketer
 Trevor Lock (born 1973), English comedian, actor and playwright
 Ulla Lock  (1934–2012), Danish film actress

See also 
 Locke (surname)
 

English-language surnames